is a Japan Air Self-Defense Force base located in the city of Yaizu, Shizuoka Prefecture, in central Japan. It is the smallest air base in Japan with a functional runway.

History
Shizuhama Air Base was established in December 1944 as the Fujieda Naval Air Station of the Imperial Japanese Navy Air Service. After World War II, the base facilities came under the control of the United States, and were returned to the Japanese government in August 1958, at which time the base was given its present name. From June 1959, the base became host to the JASDF 15th Training Wing. In May 1964, the 15th Training Wing was deactivated, and replaced by the 11th Flying Training Wing.

Organization
Shizuhama Air Base provides initial pilot flight training for the Japan Air Self Defense Force. It reports to JASDF Air Training Command, headquartered at Hamamatsu Air Base.

 11th Flying Training Wing
 1st Squadron (Fuji T-7)
 2nd Squadron (Fuji T-7)
 Shizuhama Air Traffic Control Group
 Shizuhama Weather Group
 Shizuhama Regional Military Police Group

References

External links

 Official JASDF page

Shizuhama
Shizugahama
Yaizu, Shizuoka